Vadakkanandal is a Selection Grade Town Panchayat in Kallakurichi district in the Indian state of Tamil Nadu.

Demographics
Vadakanandal is one of the biggest and fastest developing Panchayat towns in Chinnasalem Taluk. The agriculture is the backbone of the village.
 India census, Vadakkanandal had a population of 23,034. Males constitute 51% of the population and females 49%. Vadakkanandal has an average literacy rate of 61%, higher than the national average of 59.5%: male literacy is 72%, and female literacy is 49%. In Vadakkanandal, 12% of the population is under 6 years of age.

References

Cities and towns in Kallakurichi district